Langewiesen is a town and a former municipality in the Ilm-Kreis district, in Thuringia, Germany. Since July 2018, it is part of the town Ilmenau. It is situated on the river Ilm, 4 km southeast of Ilmenau.

References

Former municipalities in Thuringia
Ilm-Kreis
Schwarzburg-Sondershausen